Naheed Ezaher Khan is a Bangladesh Awami League politician and a Member of Bangladesh Parliament from a reserved seat. She is the daughter of Shaheed Colonel Khondkar Nazmul Huda who was killed in the 7 November 1975 Bangladesh coup d'état.

Career
Khan was elected to parliament from reserved seat as a Bangladesh Awami League candidate in 2019. She is a member of the Parliamentary caucus on child rights.

References

Awami League politicians
Living people
Women members of the Jatiya Sangsad
11th Jatiya Sangsad members
21st-century Bangladeshi women politicians
21st-century Bangladeshi politicians
1972 births